Arthur Borren (born 5 June 1949 in Eindhoven) is a Dutch-born former field hockey player from New Zealand who was a member of the New Zealand team that won the gold medal at the 1976 Summer Olympics in Montreal.

He was inducted into the New Zealand Sports Hall of Fame in 1990.

References

External links
 

1949 births
Living people
Dutch emigrants to New Zealand
Field hockey players at the 1972 Summer Olympics
Field hockey players at the 1976 Summer Olympics
Medalists at the 1976 Summer Olympics
New Zealand field hockey coaches
New Zealand male field hockey players
Olympic field hockey players of New Zealand
Olympic gold medalists for New Zealand
Olympic medalists in field hockey
Sportspeople from Eindhoven